Spain was one of twenty-eight nations that competed at the 1968 Summer Paralympics in Tel Aviv, Israel from November 4 to 13, 1968. The team finished twenty-first in the medal table and won four medals: three silver and one bronze, all in swimming events.
The Spanish team contained eleven athletes; nine men and two women.

Archery

Three Spanish men competed in archery, none won a medal in the sport. The best result was achieved by Bellon in the St. Nicholas round event for paraplegics.

Athletics

Spain entered four men into athletics events; no medals were won. The best placed Spanish athlete was Llorens in the men's precision javelin; he finished the qualification round in eleventh position but did not advance to the final round.

Dartchery

The only dartchery event at the Games was the mixed pairs event which took a knockout format. The Spanish pair of Llorens and Lorente defeated a team from Ireland in the first round but was eliminated by British pair Robertson and Todd in the second round.

Swimming

Four Spanish swimmers competed at the Games, two men and two women. All of Spain's medals were won in swimming events. Riu won silver medals in both the women's 50 m freestyle class 3 complete and 50 m breaststroke class 3 complete, finishing behind Forder of Great Britain in both events. In men's events Carol won a bronze medal in the 100 m breaststroke open and a silver in the 50 m breaststroke special class.

Table tennis

Two athletes played table tennis for Spain at the Games. Bellon entered the men's singles B event for Spain and also teamed up with Llorens in the men's doubles C event but failed to advance beyond the second round in either.

See also
Spain at the 1968 Summer Olympics

Notes

References

Nations at the 1968 Summer Paralympics
1968
Paralympics